Alberta is a rural locality in the Shire of Banana, Queensland, Australia.

Geography 
Part of the Dawson Range State Forest is in the north-west of the locality, used for commercial forestry. Apart from that, the land use is predominantly grazing on native vegetation with some crop growing in the south of the locality.

There are a number of homesteads in the locality, including:
 Blue Hills
 Rosedale

History 

Education 
There are no schools in Alberta. The nearest government primary schools are Baralaba State School in neighbouring Baralaba to the east and Moura State School in neighbouring Moura to the south-east. The nearest government secondary schools are Baralaba State School (to Year 10) and Moura State High School (to Year 12) in neighbouring Moura to the south-east.

References 

Shire of Banana
Localities in Queensland